Edmund Wheeler (29 March 1889 – 14 November 1961) was an Irish Gaelic footballer. His championship career with the Wexford senior team spanned eight seasons from 1910 until 1917.

Honours

Blues and Whites
Wexford Senior Football Championship (2): 1914, 1916

Wexford
All-Ireland Senior Football Championship (2): 1915, 1916
Leinster Senior Football Championship (2): 1915, 1916

References

1887 births
1961 deaths
Blues and Whites Gaelic footballers
Wexford inter-county Gaelic footballers